St Peter & St Paul's Church is a Grade II* listed parish church in the Church of England in Gringley-on-the-Hill.

History

The church dates from the 13th century and has been added to or restored in every century since. The south aisle was added in 1910 - 1912 for Revd. Charles Bailey.

The church is in a joint benefice with:
St. Peter's Church, Clayworth
All Saints' Church, Misterton
All Saints' Church, Beckingham
St. Mary Magdalene Church, Walkeringham
St. Mary, the Blessed Virgin Mary Church, West Stockwith

Organ
The organ is by Bevington and Sons. A specification of the organ can be found on the National Pipe Organ Register.

References

Church of England church buildings in Nottinghamshire
Gringley
Peter and Paul